Tomás Ezequiel Castro Ponce (born 3 March 2001) is an Argentine professional footballer who plays as an attacking midfielder for Godoy Cruz, on loan from River Plate.

Career
Castro Ponce is a product of the River Plate youth system, having joined in 2014 from Escuela de Fútbol EFIC. He notably scored goals against Millonarios and Libertad at the 2020 U-20 Copa Libertadores in Paraguay. He made the breakthrough into Marcelo Gallardo's first-team squad later that year, appearing as an unused substitute in early November for Copa de la Liga Profesional victories away to Godoy Cruz and Banfield. Castro Ponce made his senior debut in the same competition on 28 November against Rosario Central, featuring for the final eight minutes of a two-goal away win.

On 5 January 2022, Ponce joined Godoy Cruz on a one-year loan deal with a purchase option.

Career statistics
.

Notes

References

External links

2001 births
Living people
People from San Luis Province
Argentine footballers
Association football midfielders
Argentine Primera División players
Club Atlético River Plate footballers
Godoy Cruz Antonio Tomba footballers